Killmacuagh (Castlemaine) is a townland in Athlone, County Westmeath, Ireland. The townland is in the civil parish of St. Mary's.

The townland stands in the southeast area of the town, and is bordered to the south by the Dublin–Westport/Galway railway line. The An Post Athlone Mail centre stands in the townland, as well as number of private mail couriers such as DPD.

References 

Townlands of County Westmeath